Udupi Chikmagalur Lok Sabha constituency is one of the 28 Lok Sabha (lower house of Indian parliament) constituencies in Karnataka a state in southern India. This constituency was created as part of the implementation of the delimitation of the parliamentary constituencies in 2008, based on the recommendations of the Delimitation Commission of India constituted in 2002. It first held elections in 2009 and its first member of parliament was D. V. Sadananda Gowda of the Bharatiya Janata Party (BJP). Gowda was selected on 4 August 2011 to become Chief Minister (CM) of Karnataka after the previous CM B. S. Yeddyurappa resigned. He therefore had to resign as MP for this seat which forced a by-election in 2012. This by-election was won by K. Jayaprakash Hegde of the Indian National Congress (INC). As of the latest elections in 2019, Shobha Karandlaje of the BJP represents this constituency.

Assembly segments
As of 2014, Udupi Chikmagalur Lok Sabha constituency comprises the following eight Vidhan Sabha (Legislative Assembly) segments:

Members of Parliament
 This seat was created in 2008 re-organization of Lok Sabha  seats. For results before that, see : South Kanara (North), Chikmagalur and Udupi

Election results

General election 2019

General election 2014

By-election 2012

General election 2009

See also
Udupi Lok Sabha constituency
Chikmagalur Lok Sabha constituency (1967-2004 elections)
Hassan Chickmagalur Lok Sabha constituency, only for 1952 election  
South Kanara (North) Lok Sabha constituency

References

External links
Udupi Chikmagalur lok sabha constituency election 2019 date and schedule

Lok Sabha constituencies in Karnataka
Chikkamagaluru district
Udupi district